The naval Battle of Chilcheollyang took place on the night of 28 August 1597. It resulted in the destruction of nearly the entire Korean fleet.

Background
Prior to the battle, the previous naval commander Yi Sun-sin, had been removed from his post due to a Japanese plot. The less experienced Won Gyun was promoted in Yi's place.
Won Gyun set sail for Busan on 17 August with the entire fleet, some 200 ships.

Battle

The Korean fleet arrived near Busan on 20 August in 1597. As the day was about to end, they met a force of 500 to 1,000 Japanese ships arrayed against them. Won Gyun ordered a general attack on the enemy armada, but the Japanese fell back, letting the Koreans pursue. After a few back and forth exchanges, with one chasing the other, one retreating, the Japanese turned around one last time, destroying 30 ships and scattering the Korean fleet.

Won's men docked at Gadeok and ran ashore to find water where they were ambushed by 3,000 enemy troops under Shimazu Yoshihiro. They lost 400 men and several vessels.

From Gadeok, Won retreated north and west into the strait between Geoje and the island of Chilchon, Chilchonnyang. Won Gyun then retired to his flagship and refused to see anyone. The entire fleet sat in the strait for an entire week.

The Japanese commanders convened on 22 August to plan a joint assault on the Koreans. Shimazu Yoshihiro ferried 2,000 of his men to Geoje, where he arrayed them on the northwest coast, overlooking the Korean fleet below.

On the night of 28 August, a Japanese fleet of 500 ships moved into the strait and attacked. By dawn, nearly all the Korean ships had been destroyed.

Won Gyun fled to the mainland but could not keep up with his men. He sat down under a pine tree until the Japanese found him. It is assumed that his head was cut off.

Yi Eokgi also died during the battle after drowning himself.

Aftermath
Prior to the destruction on 28 August, Bae Seol shifted 12 ships to an inlet farther down the strait and managed to escape. Bae Seol set fire to the camps at Hansando before the Japanese arrived. He then sailed west with the remaining 12 ships, all that was left of the Korean navy.

Citations

Bibliography

 
 
 
 
 
 
 
 
 
 
 
 桑田忠親 [Kuwata, Tadachika], ed., 舊參謀本部編纂, [Kyu Sanbo Honbu], 朝鮮の役 [Chousen no Eki]　(日本の戰史 [Nihon no Senshi] Vol. 5), 1965.
 
 
 
 
 
 
 
 
 
 
 
 
  
 
 
 
 
 
 
 

Chilchonryang
1597 in Korea
Chilcheollyang
Yi Sun-sin